Joel Robert Paul Rollinson (born 16 November 1998) is an Australian professional footballer who plays as a midfielder for National League South club Hungerford Town.

Career

Early career
Rollinson began his career at Reading, playing for the club's under-18, under-19 and under-23 teams. He made two appearances for the Reading under-23 team in the EFL Trophy during the 2017–18 season, making his debut as an 88th-minute substitute in a 2–2 draw at Colchester United on 27 August 2017. He scored in a 7–5 away defeat to Gillingham on 7 November 2017.

Having not made any first-team appearances for Reading, Rollinson joined National League South club Eastbourne Borough on loan on 16 November 2018. The loan agreement was scheduled to run for one month, until 16 December 2018. He made his debut a day later, playing the opening 73 minutes in a 1–0 away defeat to Bath City. After making four appearances during the loan spell, the loan was extended for a further month. Rollinson scored in a 2–1 home victory over Dulwich Hamlet on 1 January 2019. He made 13 appearances during the loan spell, scoring once. Rollinson was released by Reading at the end of the season.

Stevenage
Ahead of the 2019–20 season, Rollinson spent time on trial at League Two club Stevenage. He subsequently signed for the club on a permanent basis on 5 August 2019. Rollinson made his Stevenage debut in the club's 1–0 home defeat to Bradford City on 20 August 2019, coming on as an 85th-minute substitute in the match. Having made one further first-team appearance for Stevenage during the opening three months of the season, Rollinson joined Isthmian League Premier Division club Cray Wanderers on a three-month loan agreement on 5 November 2019. He scored after 38 seconds of his debut in a 6–1 victory against Cheshunt on 9 November 2019. The loan deal was extended for the rest of the season on 9 February 2020. He made 20 appearances during the loan spell, scoring three times. Rollinson was released by Stevenage in June 2020.

Eastbourne Borough
Ahead of the 2020–21 season, Rollinson returned to Eastbourne Borough on a permanent basis. He made 23 appearances during his first season back at Eastbourne, scoring three times, as the National League South season was curtailed in February 2021 due to restrictions associated with the COVID-19 pandemic.

Hungerford Town
On 7 June 2022, Rollinson joined fellow National League South club Hungerford Town.

Career statistics

References

External links

1998 births
Living people
Sportspeople from Reading, Berkshire
Australian soccer players
Association football midfielders
Reading F.C. players
Eastbourne Borough F.C. players
Stevenage F.C. players
Cray Wanderers F.C. players
Hungerford Town F.C. players
English Football League players
National League (English football) players